Suhasini Abhisheka Wimalaweera  (born 11 November 1988) is a Sri Lankan singer, an entrepreneur, an indigenous skin doctor, novelist and a lyricist. In 2022, she became the Winning Coach at "The Voice Teens Sri Lanka".

Early and personal life 

Abhisheka was born on 11 Novenmber 1988 in Galle, Sri Lanka. She is the only child of Sunil Wimalaweera who was a Film Director, Lyricist and Author, and Damayanthi Wimalaweera. She completed her primary education at Sacred Heart Convent Galle. Then she attended St. Paul's Girls School, Milagiriya to complete her secondary education. In 2006 Abhisheka received the title Sangeet Visharad from Bhatkhande Music Institute Deemed University in India, Lucknow. In 2013 she received the Bachelor of Arts degree for Music from University of Colombo, Sri Lanka. In 2019, she joined the University of Colombo as a Lecturer in Music.  

In 2020 she completed her Master's degree in Music at the University of Kelaniya, Sri Lanka.      

She is married and the couple has a daughter named Fairy Abhilasya Alahakoon.

Career

Singing

Film playback singing 
Abhisheka's playback singing career began with her performance in the song "Mangalam Pathala" from the film Sanjana directed by Hemasiri Sellaperuma. In 2009 she performed in the song "Nil Nuwan Pathu Sema" for the film Sinasuna Adaren directed by Eranga Senaratne. In 2011, Udayakantha Warnasuriya gave her the opportunity to contribute to the soundtrack "Prarthana Bidi Na" in the film Challenges . In 2013, she provided vocals for the song "Heena Dam Mitak".

Further she complimented her vocals in two films that were released in 2014. She performed in the song "Me Minisath Bawe Lowe" from the film Que Sera directed by Parakrama Jayasinghe. During the same year she contributed in the soundtrack "Hawasaka Ma" from the film Rupantharana directed by Nalaka Withange. "Hawasaka Ma" song was a duet performed by Abhisheka with Lahiru Perera. In 2018 Abhisheka performed in the song "Madhu Sandakan" for the film Wassanaye Sanda directed by Udayakantha Warnasuriya.

Teledrama playback singing 
Abhisheka's teledrama playback singing debut began with the "Amaa" teledrama theme song "Dekopul Kandulin Thema". The song was featured with the singing artist Lahiru Perera. In 2015 she featured in the song "Hithe Inne Den Oyamai" from the teledrama "Adarei Man Adarei" aired in Hiru TV. She also provided her vocals for the theme songs "Charithayakata Paata Denna" and "Me Nisha Yamaye" from the teledramas "Charithayakata Paata Denna" and "Blackmail" respectively. The two teledramas were telecasted on the Independent Television Network. 

She recently performed for the "Ras" teledrama theme song "Apa Hamu Nowuna Nam" which was aired in Sirasa TV.

Television Shows

Solo Songs

Film Songs

References 

23.https://www.srilankamirror.com/features/21182-abhisheka-vocalist-playback-singer-lyricist-author-cum-entrepreneur

24.http://www.sundaytimes.lk/210117/magazine/abhisheka-multi-faceted-personality-428595.html

25.http://www.sarasaviya.lk/interviews/2021/02/11/19840/%E0%B6%91%E0%B6%AF%E0%B7%8F-%E0%B6%94%E0%B6%BA-%E0%B6%87%E0%B7%83%E0%B7%8A%E0%B6%AF%E0%B7%92%E0%B7%84%E0%B7%8F-%E0%B6%B1%E0%B7%9C%E0%B6%B6%E0%B6%BD%E0%B6%B8-%E0%B6%B6%E0%B7%92%E0%B6%B8-%E0%B6%B6%E0%B6%BD%E0%B7%8F%E0%B6%9C%E0%B7%99%E0%B6%B1-%E0%B6%BA%E0%B6%B1%E0%B7%8A%E0%B6%B1-%E0%B6%AD%E0%B7%92%E0%B6%B6%E0%B7%94%E0%B6%AB%E0%B7%8F

26. http://www.dailynews.lk/2021/07/20/tc/254418/empowering-and-inspiring-youth

External links
 

 
Living people
1988 births
Sinhalese singers
21st-century Sri Lankan women singers
Sinhalese academics